Bernard Bultel (13 November 1930 – 30 November 2009) was a French racing cyclist. He rode in the 1953 Tour de France.

References

1930 births
2009 deaths
French male cyclists
Place of birth missing